Teijo Finneman (born 9 September 1944) is a Finnish basketball player. He competed in the men's tournament at the 1964 Summer Olympics.

References

1944 births
Living people
Finnish men's basketball players
Olympic basketball players of Finland
Basketball players at the 1964 Summer Olympics
Sportspeople from Helsinki